Free Will is a 2012 book by American philosopher Sam Harris. It argues that free will is an illusion, but that this does not undermine morality or diminish the importance of political and social freedom, and that it can and should change the way we think about some of the most important questions in life.

Summary
Harris says the idea of free will "cannot be mapped on to any conceivable reality" and is incoherent. According to Harris, science "reveals you to be a biochemical puppet." People's thoughts and intentions, Harris says, "emerge from background causes of which we are unaware and over which we exert no conscious control." Every choice we make is made as a result of preceding causes. These choices we make are determined by those causes, and are therefore not really choices at all. Furthermore, Harris states that our thoughts and intentions arise from background causes that we cannot control and thus our actions influenced by these thoughts are also uncontrollable. Harris also draws a distinction between conscious and unconscious reactions to the world. Even without free will, consciousness has an important role to play in the choices we make. Harris argues that this realization about the human mind does not undermine morality or diminish the importance of social and political freedom, but it can and should change the way we think about some of the most important questions in life.

Reception
The book has been the subject of criticism. For example, in a critical review, philosopher and cognitive scientist Daniel Dennett argued that Free Will attacks only the "popular" idea of free will, which Dennett accepts to be flawed. He states that "improvements" to the popular idea of free will exist and that Harris should have instead addressed these. Harris published a response. Commenting on both Dennett's review and Harris' reply, author Richard Carrier criticised Harris' response, saying Dennett "extensively cites experts and published work in the subject" while Harris did not, further claiming Harris held the field of philosophy in "contempt".

See also
 Immanuel Kant
 Neuroscience of free will

References

2012 non-fiction books
Books by Sam Harris
American non-fiction books
Free will
Determinism
English-language books